Jeff or Jeffrey Jones may refer to:

Arts 
Jeffrey Catherine Jones (1944–2011), American artist
Jeffrey Jones (born 1946), American actor
Jeff Jones (musician) (born 1953), Canadian musician
Jeff Jones (hip hop musician), American musician

Politics 
Jeff Jones (activist) (born 1947), American environmental activist
Jeff Jones (Welsh politician) (fl. 1996–2004)
Jeffrey Max Jones (born 1958), Mexican politician
Jeffery Jones (mayor) (born 1958), mayor of Paterson, New Jersey

Sports 
Jeffrey Jones (footballer) (1886–1976), Llandrindod Wells F.C. and Wales international footballer
Jeff Jones (cricketer, born 1941), Welsh cricketer who played for England
Jefferson Jones (cricketer) (born 1954), Barbadian-born English cricketer
Jeff Jones (pitcher) (born 1956), American baseball player, also coach 
Jeff Jones (outfielder) (born 1957), American baseball player
Jeff Jones (Guyanese cricketer) (born 1958)
Jeff Jones (basketball) (born 1960), American basketball coach
Jeff Jones (American football) (born 1972), American football player with the 1995 Detroit Lions
Jeffrey Jones (racing driver) (born 1982), American racing driver in the 2001 Masters of Formula 3

Other
Jeff Jones (music industry executive) (born c. 1950), American businessman
Jeffrey P. Jones, director of the George Foster Peabody Awards
Jeff Jones (executive) (born 1968), American business executive, marketer and advertiser
Jeffrey Jones, a character on Voyagers!

See also
Geoffrey Jones (disambiguation)